The 2014 European Stock 600 Series season was a motorcycle racing series that started over 2–4 May 2014 in Navarra, Spain and ended over 4–6 July at the Automotodróm Slovakia Ring, Slovakia. European Stock 600, abbreviated as ACC 600, was a part of Acceleration 2014, a series of festivals combining top class car and bike racing with music and entertainment. Next to ACC 600, there was the Formula Acceleration 1, based on the former A1 Grand Prix, the MW-V6 Pickup Series, which used modified BRL V6 cars, the Legend SuperCup, based on legends car racing, and the European Stock 1000 Series, which featured slightly faster bikes and slightly older riders than the ACC 1000. As for the music, on Friday evenings, David Hasselhoff hosted "Celebrate the 80's and the 90's with The Hoff", a dance party featuring 2 Unlimited, Haddaway, Kim Wilde, and others. Saturday evenings saw performances of international DJs.

Two different riders won the races that were held towards the championship. At Navarra, Paco Morales Aibar won ahead of Jesus Ordás Aguado and Pedro Pérez Soto. While at the Slovakia Ring, only three riders competed in the class; here, Roman Kudlik won ahead of Pavol Grman and Jozef Bielik.

Calendar
The 2014 calendar consisted of two races. Originally, seven were planned. However, Acceleration in Zolder, Acceleration at Paul Ricard, and Acceleration at Grobnik were cancelled on 27 June 2014 and Acceleration at Hungaroring was cancelled on 20 August 2014. Finally, during Acceleration in Assen, the European Stock 600 Series was replaced by the national Open Wegrace Cup series, whose riders were not eligible to score points for the Acceleration championship.

Technical specifications
Engine:4-cylinder (401–600 cc) 4-stroke3-cylinder (401–675 cc) 4-stroke2-cylinder (401–750 cc) 4-stroke
Minimum weight: 165 kg
Tyres: Michelin

Championship standings

Scoring system
Points were awarded to the top 15 classified riders. Riders did not have to finish to be eligible for points, but had to complete 75% of the race. At the end of the season, the ACC 600 Riders' title was awarded to the rider with the highest number of points.

Points allocation

Riders' championship

References

External links
 

European Stock 600
European Stock 600
Stock 600